Plectrura spinicauda is a species of beetle in the family Cerambycidae. It was described by Victor Motschulsky in 1845. It is known from the United States and Canada.

References

Morimopsini
Beetles described in 1845